Russia participated in the Eurovision Song Contest 2019 with the song "Scream", written by Philipp Kirkorov, Dimitris Kontopoulos and Sharon Vaughn. The song was performed by Sergey Lazarev, who was internally selected by the Russian broadcaster Russia-1 to represent the nation at the 2019 contest in Tel Aviv, Israel.

Background

Prior to the 2019 contest, Russia had participated in the Eurovision Song Contest 21 times since its first entry in 1994. Russia had won the contest on one occasion in 2008 with the song "Believe" performed by Dima Bilan. In , Russia finished third with the song "You Are the Only One" performed by Russia's 2019 entrant Sergey Lazarev.

Before Eurovision

Internal selection 
On 7 February 2019, Russian broadcaster RTR announced that Sergey Lazarev would represent Russia in 2019. His song for the contest, "Scream", was released on 9 March 2019. Sergey Lazarev was selected as the Russian entrant by an expert committee from seven shortlisted candidates, among them which also included Aleksandr Panayotov, Egor Kreed, Elena Temnikova, Manizha, Olga Buzova and Philipp Kirkorov, as reported by Russian media. After several Russian online media outlets published information about the shortlist of entrants for Eurovision 2019, RTR stated that "The list of candidates does not exist and is unlikely to exist" and the entrant will be named at the end of January.

At Eurovision
According to Eurovision rules, all nations with the exceptions of the host country and the "Big Five" (France, Germany, Italy, Spain and the United Kingdom) are required to qualify from one of two semi-finals in order to compete for the final; the top ten countries from each semi-final progress to the final. The European Broadcasting Union (EBU) split up the competing countries into six different pots based on voting patterns from previous contests, with countries with favourable voting histories put into the same pot. On 28 January 2019, a special allocation draw was held which placed each country into one of the two semi-finals, as well as which half of the show they would perform in. Russia was placed into the second semi-final, to be held on 16 May 2019, and was scheduled to perform in the second half of the show.

Once all the competing songs for the 2019 contest had been released, the running order for the semi-finals was decided by the shows' producers rather than through another draw, so that similar songs were not placed next to each other. Russia was set to perform in position 13, following the entry from Lithuania and preceding the entry from Albania.

Semi-final
Russia performed thirteenth in the second semi-final, following the entry from Lithuania and preceding the entry from Albania. At the end of the show, Russia was announced as having finished in the top 10 and subsequently qualifying for the grand final. It was later revealed that Russia placed sixth in the semi-final, receiving a total of 217 points: 124 points from the televoting and 93 points from the juries.

Voting
Voting during the three shows involved each country awarding two sets of points from 1–8, 10 and 12: one from their professional jury and the other from televoting. Each nation's jury consisted of five music industry professionals who are citizens of the country they represent, with their names published before the contest to ensure transparency. This jury judged each entry based on: vocal capacity; the stage performance; the song's composition and originality; and the overall impression by the act. In addition, no member of a national jury was permitted to be related in any way to any of the competing acts in such a way that they cannot vote impartially and independently. The individual rankings of each jury member as well as the nation's televoting results will be released shortly after the grand final.

Points awarded to Russia

Points awarded by Russia

Detailed voting results
The following members comprised the Russian jury:
  (jury chairperson)composer, pianist
 Simon Osiashvilipoet, singer
 fashion designer, TV host
 Anastasia Tolmachevasinger, winner of the Junior Eurovision Song Contest 2006, represented Russia in the 2014 contest
 Maria Tolmachevasinger, winner of the Junior Eurovision Song Contest 2006, represented Russia in the 2014 contest

Notes and references

Notes

References

2019
Countries in the Eurovision Song Contest 2019
Eurovision